The 1994–95 season of the Moroccan Throne Cup was the 39th edition of the competition.

Fath Union Sport won the cup, beating Olympique de Khouribga 2–0 in the final, played at the Prince Moulay Abdellah Stadium in Rabat. Fath Union Sport won the competition for the fourth time in their history.

Tournament

Last 16

Quarter-finals

Semi-finals

Final 
The final took place between the two winning semi-finalists, Fath Union Sport and Olympique de Khouribga, on 18 July 1995 at the Prince Moulay Abdellah Stadium in Rabat.

Notes and references 

1994
1994 in association football
1995 in association football
1994–95 in Moroccan football